Claudia Fabiana Fernández Viera (born June 22, 1976) is a Uruguayan award-winning television presenter, fashion model, actress and businesswoman. Born in Punta de Rieles – Bella Italia, Montevideo she began her career as a model in her teens and participated in numerous advertising campaigns. In the late 1990s, she began working on television, on the show Dale que Podés. She also participated in the reality show Bailando por un Sueño, and in the talk show Animales Sueltos, both in Argentina.

Early and personal life 
Claudia Fabiana Fernández Viera was born in barrio Punta de Rieles – Bella Italia, Montevideo on June 22, 1976. She was raised by her father Fernando Fernández, and her paternal-grandparents, Irma and Juan Antonio Fernández. She has four siblings: Mariana, Fernando, Adriana and Karina. Fernández attended Colegio Sagrado Corazón De Jesús - Liceo Vedruna. 

Fernández is a Roman Catholic. She married Argentine businessman Leonel Delménico on April 24, 2009 in Buenos Aires and on June 5, 2009 in Montevideo. On November 6 of the same year Fernández gave birth to her first child named, Mía Elena. On December 8 of 2013 she had a second baby, a boy called Renzo.

Modeling career 
Her beginnings in the world of fashion began when she was 15 years old and a photographer discovered her arm walking with her grandmother, Irma by Avenue July 18 next to the cinema of Censa. She began working as the model for María Raquel Bonifaccino & Carlos Cámara, soon after her figure started to appear on Channel 4(Uruguay). She also ranks among the books of the model agency of Diego Ríos.

Fernández has modeled for Caras in Argentina, Playboy in Argentina and Uruguay and Gente in Uruguay, among others.

Theatrical career 
2009-2010: Fortuna - (Lead Actress and Vedette) Alongside Ricardo Fort, Claudia Ciardone and Virginia Gallardo.
2010-2011: El gran show - (Second Vedette)
2010-2011: Furtuna 2 - (Lead Actress and Vedette)
2011: La Magia del Tupilán - (Actress) - (Uruguay)
2011-2012: Gemelas - (Lead Actress) - (Uruguay) Alongside Gladys Florimonte.
2011-2012: Que Gauchita es mi Mucama - (Lead Actress) Teatro Astros (Buenos Aires)
2012: La Magia de Claudia - (Montevideo)
2012–present: Cirugía para Dos - (Supporting Actress) - (Villa Carlos Paz)

Television career 
In 2005 she starred in the reality show Cambio de Vida (es), the Uruguayan version of The Simple Life, where she and Tammara Benasús played bratty city girls trying to survive in rural surroundings.

In 2007 Fernández entered in the fourth season of ShowMatch with Maximiliano D'Iorio as a replacement for the Argentine actress, vedette and comedian, Iliana Calabró in the re-entry round. She was eliminated in the 22nd round. She paritcipated in the fifth season of Bailando por un Sueño with Julian Carvajal as a replacement for the Argentine vedette and model, Eliana Guercio in the re-entry round. She was eliminated in the 26th round, having danced only 2 rounds.

In February 2017, she replaced Diego González as host of Escape Perfecto - Edición Famosos; The show co-hosted by Annasofía Facello and broadcast on Channel 10 ended on June 17, 2020. During the second half of 2019, she presented ¿Qué haría tu hijo?, the local adaptation of the British program What Would Your Kid Do?. In September 2019, it was announced that Fernández would be part of Got Talent Uruguay as a member of the panel of judges, along with Orlando Petinatti, María Noel Ricceto and Agustín Casanova. The first season of the show premiered on June 22, 2020, while the second on April 12, 2021.

Filmography

References

External links 

 

 Claudia Fernández Blogspot
 

  Canal 13's Showmatch website

1976 births
Living people
People from Montevideo
Uruguayan people of Spanish descent
Uruguayan expatriate actresses in Argentina
Expatriate models in Argentina
21st-century Uruguayan actresses
Uruguayan film actresses
Uruguayan stage actresses
Uruguayan female models
Uruguayan female dancers
Participants in Argentine reality television series
Burlesque performers
Uruguayan vedettes
Uruguayan musical theatre actresses
Women television personalities